Beruniy is a station of the Tashkent Metro, it is the northwestern terminus of the Oʻzbekiston Line. The station was opened on 30 April 1991 as part of the extension of the line from Chorsu to Beruniy. 
The station is designed in national traditions of Uzbekistan: the platform hall is decorated by a dome covered with marble patterns. The plant has crystal chandeliers, with all - in the lobby, in the walls of the stairs and in the hall are made in the same style (painter S. Jalilov). Interior wall decoration station is made with marble, granite, metal, glass, porcelain.

References

Tashkent Metro stations
Railway stations opened in 1991
1991 establishments in Uzbekistan